The Seal of Northern Mariana Islands takes its inspiration from the United Nations, as the NMI had once been a UN Trust Territory.

Design
The seal consists of a blue field superimposed with a white star and a latte stone, a Chamorro house foundation. The decorative wreath or mwarmwar was added in 1981, and maintains the link between the islands and its sacred history and customs.

See also
Flag of the Northern Mariana Islands

References

External links

Northern Mariana Islands
National symbols of the Northern Mariana Islands
Northern Mariana Islands
Northern Mariana Islands
Northern Mariana Islands